Tommy Todd (1 June 1926 – 7 December 2014) was a Scottish footballer who played as a centre-forward for Airdrieonians and Hamilton Academical in the Scottish Football League and Crewe Alexandra, Derby County and Rochdale in the (English) Football League.

References

External links

1926 births
2014 deaths
People from Stonehouse, South Lanarkshire
Association football forwards
Scottish footballers
Burnbank Athletic F.C. players
Motherwell F.C. players
Airdrieonians F.C. (1878) players
Hamilton Academical F.C. players
Crewe Alexandra F.C. players
Derby County F.C. players
Rochdale A.F.C. players
Elgin City F.C. players
Scottish Football League players
English Football League players